BellSouth Telecommunications, LLC was an operating company of AT&T that served the southeastern United States. It consisted of the operations of Southern Bell and South Central Bell.

BellSouth Telecommunications was a subsidiary of BellSouth Corporation which was acquired by AT&T Inc. on December 29, 2006.

History
BellSouth Telecommunications was formed in 1983 as SBT&T Co.. Incorporated in Georgia in 1983, it replaced the original Southern Bell Telephone and Telegraph Company that was incorporated in New York in 1879. SBT&T Co. and Southern Bell merged on December 31, 1983, and the merged company took the Southern Bell name.

South Central Bell
South Central Bell Telephone Company served what had been the western portion of the "old" Southern Bell's territory until 1967. In 1983, BellSouth Corporation was formed as the holding company for South Central Bell and the "new" Southern Bell, effectively reuniting most telephone service in the Southeastern United States. South Central Bell was headquartered in (what is now) the AT&T City Center building in Birmingham, Alabama.

BellSouth Services
BellSouth Services, Inc. was the name of the shared service company formed to provide common functions such as engineering and information technology across the nine state Southern Bell and South Central Bell operating region.

The division was headquartered in Birmingham, Alabama in what is now the AT&T Colonnade North and South buildings.

Operating company merger
On January 1, 1992, BellSouth merged South Central Bell and BellSouth Services into Southern Bell, creating a single operating company which was renamed BellSouth Telecommunications, Inc., one year after U S WEST had done the same by merging its operations into Mountain Bell which was renamed U S WEST Communications. The merger reconstituted the size of the original Southern Bell before the South Central Bell split-off. BellSouth Telecommunications continued to do business as Southern Bell and South Central Bell until 1995, when BellSouth was adopted as the sole customer-facing brand.

Acquisition
On March 5, 2006, AT&T (SBC after acquiring the original AT&T) announced its intentions to acquire BellSouth Corporation, and on December 29, 2006 BellSouth Telecommunications became an operating company of AT&T The merger also consolidated the ownership of Cingular Wireless, which became AT&T Mobility.

BellSouth Telecommunications ceased doing business under the BellSouth name on June 30, 2007. It now does business under the following names:
AT&T Alabama
AT&T Florida
AT&T Georgia
AT&T Kentucky
AT&T Louisiana
AT&T Mississippi
AT&T North Carolina
AT&T South Carolina
AT&T Southeast
AT&T Tennessee

On July 1, 2011, BellSouth Telecommunications was converted into a limited liability company, becoming known as BellSouth Telecommunications, LLC.

See also
American Telephone and Telegraph Company
AT&T
Bell System Divestiture
BellSouth Corporation
South Central Bell
Southern Bell

References

AT&T subsidiaries
Telecommunications companies of the United States
Telecommunications companies established in 1983
Companies based in Atlanta
Communications in Alabama
Communications in Florida
Communications in Georgia (U.S. state)
Communications in Kentucky
Communications in Louisiana
Communications in Mississippi
Communications in North Carolina
Communications in South Carolina
Communications in Tennessee
1983 establishments in Georgia (U.S. state)
2007 disestablishments in Georgia (U.S. state)

simple:BellSouth Telecommunications